The 2022 FAO League will be the eleventh season of the FAO League, the top Odia professional football league, since its establishment in 2010. Sports Hostel are the defending champions. FAO League is annually organised by the Football Association of Odisha (FAO), the official football governing body of Odisha, in association with Department of Sports & Youth Services (DSYS), Government of Odisha.

Due to the COVID-19 pandemic in India, the FAO League had not been organised since its last edition in 2019. After a span of two years, the regular season kicked-off from 3 July 2022. The inauguration ceremony took place at the Barabati Stadium, Cuttack. Bhabani Shankar Chayani, Collector & District Magistrate, Cuttack, graced the occasion as the Chief Guest, alongside Pankaj Lochan Mohanty, President, Odisha Cricket Association, as the Guest of Honour. Asirbad Behera, Secretary, Football Association of Odisha, along with all the office bearers and members of Football Association of Odisha, were present for the inauguration ceremony.

Sunrise Club and Radha Raman Club were declared as joint-champions with both teams finishing the Diamond League with 16 points each from 7 games. Both teams won the match 5 times, drew once, and lost once, however, Sunrise Cub emerged at the top of the table as a result of head-to-head points. Bidanasi Club won the Gold League, and earned promotion to the Diamond League for the next season with 16 points from 6 games, where they won 5 and drew 1 of their matches. Kishore Club were the winners of the Silver League, beating Town Club 2-0 in the play-off match of the Silver League. For the 2022 FAO Super Cup, Sunrise Club, Radha Raman Club, Sports Hostel, and Young Utkal Club qualify from the Diamond League, Bidanasi Club, Rising Star Club, and Jay Durga Club qualify from the Gold League, and Kishore Club qualify from the Silver League.

Teams

Diamond

East Coast Railway
Odisha Police
Radha Raman Club
Rising Students Club
Rovers Athletic Club
Sports Hostel
Sunrise Club
Young Utkal Club

Gold

Bidanasi Club
Chand Club
Jay Durga Club
Rising Star Club
Mangala Club
Radha Gobinda Club
Sunshine Club

Silver

Silver A

Azad Hind Club
Kishore Club
Lalbag Club
SBI Sports Recreation Club

Silver B

Chauliaganj Club
Odisha Government Press Club
Town Club
Royal Club
Yuva Vandhu Cultural Group (YVCG)

Venue

League stage

Diamond League

Gold League

Silver League

Group stage

Group A

Group B

Play-off

Statistics

Scoring

Diamond League

Gold League 

|}

Silver League

Hat-tricks

Own-goals

References

FAO League
Sports competitions in Odisha
Ind
1